South Central Junior-Senior High School is a public high school located in Union Mills, Indiana, United States.

Notable alumni

 Sean Manaea – Major League Baseball player

See also
 List of high schools in Indiana

References

External links
 Official Website

Schools in LaPorte County, Indiana
Public middle schools in Indiana
Public high schools in Indiana